Songbook is an acoustic live album by American musician and Soundgarden vocalist Chris Cornell, released on November 21, 2011. The live album features songs recorded during Cornell's Songbook Tour, an acoustic solo tour which took place from March to May 2011 in the US and Canada, and is his first live album as a solo artist.

The songs on the tour varied in every show, and the album was recorded during various shows on the tour, and includes songs from Cornell's whole career: solo material, Soundgarden songs, Audioslave songs, Temple of the Dog songs, as well as covers of Led Zeppelin's "Thank You" and John Lennon's "Imagine".

The album debuted on the Billboard 200 at No. 69. It has sold 86,000 copies in the US as of August 2015.

Song Information
The album includes a new song by Chris Cornell, entitled "The Keeper"; the song was written exclusively for the Marc Forster directed 2011 film, Machine Gun Preacher, and released as the lead track from the film's soundtrack in August 2011. Another new song on the album is "Cleaning My Gun", a song Cornell had been playing live during his acoustic shows for years but was never previously released on an album.

The first track on the album "As Hope and Promise Fade", was previously released as a hidden track on Cornell's third solo album, Scream, under the title "Two Drink Minimum".

Track listing

Charts

References

2011 live albums
Chris Cornell albums